Alhaji Kamara (born 16 April 1994) is a Sierra Leonean professional footballer who plays as a forward for V.League 1 club Hoàng Anh Gia Lai and the Sierra Leone national team.

Club career

He started his professional career at FC Kallon in the Sierra Leone National First Division. At a young age, he had trials with Tippeligaen club Fredrikstad FK and Portland Timbers of Major League Soccer. Eventually he was signed by Swedish club Djurgårdens IF just after turning 18 years old.

Kamara failed to make an impact at Djurgårdens IF, and instead enjoyed loan spells to IK Frej and IFK Värnamo. Before the 2014 season, he was signed by IFK Norrköping, where he positioned himself as a key player during his first season. On 31 March 2015, Kamara was loaned out to Malaysia's Super League champion, Johor Darul Ta'zim from IFK Norrköping.

However, the loan was cancelled in July 2015. He returned to Norrköping, and featured fourteen times as the team won the league.

Kamara signed for D.C. United on 11 May 2016. Kamara scored with his first touch in his debut for D.C. United just seconds after coming on against Sporting Kansas City at Children's Mercy Park. His goal was the difference, as United went on to win the match 1–0. During his time with United's USL affiliate, the Richmond Kickers, he scored a hat-trick on May 27, 2017.

On June 23, 2017, Kamara signed with Al-Taawoun.

On 2 February 2018, Kamara signed for Sheriff Tiraspol. After one year in the club, he moved to Danish Superliga club Vendsyssel FF on 19 February 2019. On 15 May 2019 it was confirmed, that Kamara would join Randers FC for the 2019–20 season on a free transfer.

Heart defect
In February 2016, it was reported that Kamara has a potential cardio issue that could have eliminated him from professional play.   Kamara was effectively put on an indefinite restrain from playing football. Kamara was evaluated by MLS Cardiologist Consultant Matthew Martinez of Allerton PA who is a specialist at MedStar Georgetown University Hospital. Through rigorous testing, Kamara was found that it was not the case that his condition could cause concern, and he was cleared to continue in his professional career with full medical clearance and it was announced that Kamara intended to continue his career in Major League Soccer club D.C. United where he would be allowed to play, with the understanding that he would undergo tests for preventative measures at the end of each season.

Career statistics
As of 12 May 2016.

International goals
Scores and results list Sierra Leone's goal tally first.

Honours
IFK Norrköping
 Allsvenskan: 2015

Randers
Danish Cup: 2020–21

References

External links
 
 
 

1994 births
Living people
Sierra Leonean footballers
Sierra Leonean expatriate footballers
F.C. Kallon players
Djurgårdens IF Fotboll players
D.C. United players
Richmond Kickers players
Allsvenskan players
Superettan players
Ettan Fotboll players
Major League Soccer players
USL Championship players
Al-Taawoun FC players
Saudi Professional League players
FC Sheriff Tiraspol players
Moldovan Super Liga players
Vendsyssel FF players
Danish Superliga players
Expatriate footballers in Sweden
Sierra Leonean expatriate sportspeople in Sweden
Expatriate footballers in Malaysia
Sierra Leonean expatriate sportspeople in Malaysia
Expatriate soccer players in the United States
Sierra Leonean expatriate sportspeople in the United States
Expatriate footballers in Saudi Arabia
Sierra Leonean expatriate sportspeople in Saudi Arabia
Expatriate footballers in Moldova
Sierra Leonean expatriate sportspeople in Moldova
Expatriate men's footballers in Denmark
Sierra Leonean expatriate sportspeople in Denmark
Association football forwards
Sierra Leone international footballers
2021 Africa Cup of Nations players